Maud Elisabeth Sundberg (22 December 1911 – 30 November 2010) was a Swedish sprint runner. She competed at the 1928 Olympics in the 100 m and 4 × 100 m events, but failed to reach the finals. Sundberg won national titles in the 60 m (1927), 80 m hurdles (1931–34, 1936–39 and 1941–42) and 4×80 m relay (1930–33 and 1936–38), and held national records over 80 m, 100 m and 80 m hurdles. She married as Maud Nörklit and was the mother-in-law of Benny Andersson, a member of the rock group ABBA. At the time of her death she was the oldest Swedish Olympian.

References

1911 births
2010 deaths
Athletes (track and field) at the 1928 Summer Olympics
Olympic athletes of Sweden
Swedish female sprinters
Olympic female sprinters
Athletes from Stockholm